Wendy's Milk Bar, formerly known as Wendy's Supa Sundaes, is an Australian ice cream parlour franchise chain consisting of over 200 stores and kiosks. It is owned by parent company Supatreats Australia, headquartered in Baulkham Hills, New South Wales.

History
The Wendy's franchise network of ice cream retail stores was founded in Adelaide, South Australia on 31 July 1979 by Bruce Koehne, John Hill, Geoff Davis and Phil Rogers. Wendy's has grown from a single store to a large franchise network of over 200 ice-cream stores spread across Australia and New Zealand. In 2014, the Singaporean company Global Food Retail Group acquired the master franchise rights for the chain.

In late 2018, multiple Wendy's Supa Sundaes in New Zealand cancelled their franchise agreements and renamed themselves to Shake Shed & Co. This was over a disagreement about ice cream suppliers, with the Australian Wendy's corporate office preferring an Australian supplier, and the New Zealand-based locations preferring New Zealand-based suppliers. In 2018, the High Court of New Zealand  ruled that the Shake Shed & Co. stores must shut down. The company went into receivership in 2020.

Meanwhile, Wendy's Supa Sundaes rebranded to "Wendy's Milk Bar", repositioning the brand as a milk bar chain. During the COVID-19 pandemic in Australia, Wendy's restaurants switched to take-away service.

References

Further reading
 - Relevant content located at the "B. Some Relevant Cases" section

External links
 Wendy's Milk Bar

Ice cream parlors
Companies based in Adelaide
Restaurants established in 1979
Dairy products companies of Australia
Restaurant chains in Australia
Ice cream brands
1979 establishments in Australia